Pnina Tamano-Shata (born 1 November 1981) is an Israeli lawyer, journalist, and politician. The first Ethiopian-born woman to enter the Knesset in 2013, in 2020 she also became the first Ethiopian-born minister after being appointed Minister of Immigrant Absorption.

Early life
Tamano-Shata was born in Wuzaba, a village located near the city of Gondar in the Amhara Region of northern Ethiopia. Her family immigrated to Israel when she was three during the evacuation of the Ethiopian Jews from Sudan nicknamed Operation Moses. She, her five brothers, and her father were among almost 7,000 Ethiopian Jews airlifted out of the country by Mossad to Israel between November 1984 and January 1985. Her mother followed several years later.

She studied law at Ono Academic College at Kiryat Ono in the Tel Aviv District, and became Deputy Chairman of the national Ethiopian Student Association.

From 2007 to 2012 she worked as a reporter for Channel 1.

Political career
Prior to the 2013 Knesset elections, Tamano-Shata joined the new Yesh Atid party. Placed 14th on the party's list, she became a Knesset member as the party won 19 seats. She was placed 13th on the party's list for the 2015 elections, but lost her seat as the party was reduced to 11 seats.

On 9 February 2018, she returned to the Knesset as a replacement for Ya'akov Peri, who had resigned following allegations that he had leaked information during a corruption investigation twenty years beforehand. Prior to the April 2019 elections, Yesh Atid became part of the Blue and White, with Tamano-Shata placed 24th on the alliance's list. She was re-elected as Blue and White won 35 seats. She was re-elected again in the September 2019 elections. Following the March 2020 elections, she was appointed Minister of Aliyah and Integration, also known as Minister of Immigrant Absorption, becoming the first Ethiopian-born minister in the Israeli government. She was officially sworn in on 17 May 2020.

In June 2021, Tamanu-Shata was awarded the Magen Begin Prize for Israeli Leadership. After being re-appointed to her ministerial role following the 2021 elections, she resigned from the Knesset under the Norwegian Law and was replaced by Alon Tal.

See also
Ethiopian Jews in Israel

References

External links

1981 births
Living people
21st-century Israeli lawyers
21st-century Israeli women politicians
21st-century women lawyers
Black Jewish members of the Knesset
Blue and White (political alliance) politicians
Ethiopian emigrants to Israel
Ethiopian Jews
Government ministers of Israel
Israel Resilience Party politicians
Israeli Jews
Israeli people of Ethiopian-Jewish descent
Israeli television journalists
Israeli women lawyers
Jewish Israeli politicians
Members of the 19th Knesset (2013–2015)
Members of the 20th Knesset (2015–2019)
Members of the 21st Knesset (2019)
Members of the 22nd Knesset (2019–2020)
Members of the 23rd Knesset (2020–2021)
Members of the 24th Knesset (2021–2022)
Members of the 25th Knesset (2022–)
Ono Academic College alumni
People from Amhara Region
Women government ministers of Israel
Women members of the Knesset
Women television journalists
Yesh Atid politicians